Krajišnik (meaning 'man from krajina' in Serbo-Croatian) may refer to:

 Krajišnik (surname)
 Krajišnik, Bosnia and Herzegovina, Bosnian village in the Gradiška municipality
 Krajišnik, Sečanj, Serbian village in the Sečanj municipality
 NK Krajišnik Velika Kladuša, Bosnian association football club

See also
 Bosanska Krajina
 Kreshnik, a given name and surname